Per Håland (7 January 1919 – 9 October 1999) was a Norwegian journalist and newspaper editor, and proponent for the Nynorsk language. He was born in Høyanger. He was a journalist for Høyanger Avis from 1939 until the outbreak of World War II, and later for the newspapers Fjordabladet, Verdens Gang, Vest-Agder and Varden. He was chief editor of the newspaper Gula Tidend for 25 years, from 1954 to 1979.

References

1919 births
1999 deaths
People from Høyanger
Norwegian newspaper editors
Nynorsk-language writers
20th-century Norwegian writers